This is a list of stadiums and indoor stadiums in Hong Kong. Stadiums with a capacity of at least 1,000 are included.

 Stadiums
Hong Kong
Stadiums
Stadiums, Hong Kong
Hong Kong
Hong Kong